Trickem is an unincorporated community in Lowndes County, Alabama, United States.

History
A post office called Trickem was established in 1891, and remained in operation until it was discontinued in 1903.

References

Unincorporated communities in Lowndes County, Alabama
Unincorporated communities in Alabama